Moritz Güdemann (19 February 1835 – 5 August 1918) was an Austrian rabbi and historian. He served as chief rabbi of Vienna.

Biography
Moritz (Moshe) Güdemann attended the Jewish school in Hildesheim, and thereafter went to a Catholic Gymnasium. He was educated at the University of Breslau (Ph.D. 1858), and took his rabbinical diploma (1862) at the newly founded Jewish Theological Seminary there. In the latter year he was called to the rabbinate of Magdeburg; in 1866 he went to Vienna as preacher, where he became rabbi in 1868, and chief rabbi in 1892.

He married his first wife, Fanny Spiegel, in 1863. After her death he married Ida Sachs, with whom he had four children.

On Zionism 
Güdemann protested the proposal to strike from the prayer-book all passages referring to the return of the Jews to the Holy Land (compare his sermon "Jerusalem, die Opfer und die Orgel," 1871). He threatened to resign over this issue. There are conflicting versions of his support for Theodor Herzl's Zionist schemes. Herzl wrote that Güdemann believed his book Der Judenstaat could "work wonders," but Güdemann later denied this and dissociated himself from any nationalist interpretation of the Bible and its promise of Jewish redemption.

Published works 
Güdemann wrote on the history of Jewish education and culture, and was associated with the Wissenschaft des Judentums movement. In addition to dozens of articles, he published the following monographs:

 "Die Geschichte der Juden in Magdeburg," 1865
 "Die Neugestaltung des Rabbinenwesens," 1866
 "Sechs Predegten," 1867
 "Jüdisches im Christenthum des Reformationszeitalters," 1870
 "Jüdisches Unterrichtswesen Während der Spanisch-Arabischen Periode," 1873
 "Religionsgeschichtliche Studien," 1876
 "Geschichte des Erziehungswesens und der Kultur der Abendländischen Juden," 3 vols., 1880–88
 "Nächstenliebe," 1890
 "Quellenschriften zur Gesch. des Unterrichts und der Erziehung bei den Deutschen Juden," 1894
 "Das Judenthum in Seinen Grundzügen und nach Seinen Geschichtlichen Grundlagen Dargestellt," 1902
 "Das Judenthum im Neutestamentlichen Zeitalter in Christlicher Darstellung," 1903.

References

External links 
 Guedemann Sermons: Over 600 of Guedemann's sermons have been digitized by the Leo Baeck Institute, New York. (German)
 Aus Meinem Leben: Guedemann's memoir has been digitized by the Leo Baeck Institute, NY. (German)
 Guide to the Moritz Guedemann Collection at the Leo Baeck Institute, New York.
 Entry in the Jewish Encyclopedia
 Moritz Güdemann: Rabbi, Historian and Apologist by Ismar Schorsch, in Leo Baeck Institute Yearbook (1966) 11 (1): 42-66. doi: 10.1093/leobaeck/11.1.42

1835 births
1918 deaths
19th-century German rabbis
Austro-Hungarian rabbis
20th-century Austrian rabbis
Chief rabbis of Vienna
Chief rabbis of Austria
People from Hildesheim